Vilavancode is a legislative assembly constituency in Kanyakumari district in the Indian state of Tamil Nadu. It is one of the 234 State Legislative Assembly Constituencies in Tamil Nadu, in India.

The Nadar community is the biggest community in this constituency with around 70% population.

The population of other communities are: 12% Meenavar, 10% Paraiyar, 4% Malayalees and 2% Muslims.

Members of the Legislative Assembly

Travancore-cochin assembly

Madras State assembly

Tamil Nadu assembly

Election results

2021

2016

2011

2006

2001

1996

1991

1989

1984

1980

1977

1971

1967

1962

1957

1954

1952

References 

 

Assembly constituencies of Tamil Nadu
Kanyakumari district